Anne Kristin Sydnes (13 May 1956 – 3 March 2017) was a Norwegian politician for the Labour Party. She was the Minister of International Development in the Ministry of Foreign Affairs during the first cabinet Stoltenberg 2000–2001. She was married to Jan Egeland, and died of cancer at the age of 60.

References

External links

1956 births
2017 deaths
Government ministers of Norway
Ministers of International Development of Norway
Women government ministers of Norway
20th-century Norwegian women politicians
20th-century Norwegian politicians
21st-century Norwegian women politicians
21st-century Norwegian politicians